The borophosphates are mixed anion compounds containing borate and phosphate anions, which may be joined together by a common oxygen atom. Compounds that contain water or hydroxy groups can also be included in the class of compounds.

Borophosphates can be classified by whether or not they are hydrated, and the anion structure, which can be single, double, triple, isolated ring, isolated branched ring, simple chain, branched chain, loop chain, layers, or three-dimensional network. The single anion compounds are the borate phosphates, which contain separate borate and phosphate groups. Some of the borophosphate structures resemble silicates.

Related compounds include aluminophosphates, which have aluminium instead of boron, gallophosphates, with gallium in place of boron, and by substituting the phosphate: boroarsenates, boroantimonates, vanadoborate.

Formation
Borophosphates can be formed by heating compounds together at up to 900 °C. The products are dense, anhydrous, and do not contain organic substances.

Solvothermal synthesis uses a non water solvent such as ethylene glycol to dissolve the product.

The flux method crystallises from a molten flux of boric acid and sodium dihydrogen phosphate at around 171.

The hydrothermal method heats the ingredients with water under pressure up to 200 °C. The ingredients are boric acid, phosphoric acid, metal salts, or organic bases. Products often contain hydrogen.

The ionothermal synthesis method uses an ionic liquid such as 1-alkyl-3-methylimidazolium bromide as a solvent. This can be done at atmospheric pressure and temperatures under 100 °C.

Characteristics
Borophosphate compounds have been investigated for magnetic, electrical, optical and catalytic properties. Some borophosphates are porous and so have surface for interaction on their interiors, not just their surface. They can reversibly absorb water, or have channels that can allow ions to conduct. The reflection of a labelled tetrahedron cannot be superimposed (even with rotation or movements), so the compounds containing phosphate and borate tetrahedrons can be non-centrosymmetric, or chiral.

List

References

Borates
Phosphates
Mixed anion compounds